Roberto Daniel Agramonte y Pichardo (3 May 1904 – 12 December 1995) was a philosopher and Cuban politician.

Education and Career 
He graduated from the University of Havana School of Law. Dr. Agramonte was also the Dean of School of Philosophy and Letters at the University of Havana. From 1947 to 1948, he was the Ambassador of Cuba to Mexico. In 1948, he returned to Cuba to run for Vice-President of Cuba with Dr. Eduardo Chibás (as President), but the election was won by Carlos Prio Socarras. 

He was the first Foreign Minister of the Cuban Revolution. He later resigned because of the Communist tilt of the government. In May 1960, he left Cuba for Puerto Rico with his family.

Personal life 
He was the son of Frank Agramonte and María Pichardo y Pichardo.  He was married to Concha María de la Concepción del Río y Madueño and they had two children, Roberto and Conchita Agramonte-del Rio.

Publications
La biología de la democracia (1927),
Programa de filosofía moral (1928),
Tratado de psicología general: un estudio sistemático de la conducta humana, 2t, (1935, 1959);
Biografía del dictador García Moreno (1935) (premiada),
El pensamiento filosófico de Varona (1935);
Varona, el filósofo del escepticismo creador (1938, 1949) (premiada),
Varona: Su vida, su obra y su influencia (Investigación compartida con Elías Entralgo y Medardo Vitier);
Sociología (1947, 1949).
José A. Caballero y los orígenes de la conciencia cubana (1952),
Sociología de la Universidad (1950, 1958),
Mendieta Nuñez y su magisterio sociológico (1961);
Sociología contemporánea (1963);
Sociología latinoamericana (1963);
Principios de sociología: un libro para latinoamericanos (1965);
Martí y su concepción del mundo (1971);
Sociología: Curso Introductorio (1972, 1978);
Martí y su concepción de la sociedad Parte I (1979), Parte II (1984);

References

1904 births
1995 deaths
People from Villa Clara Province
Partido Ortodoxo politicians
Foreign ministers of Cuba
Ambassadors of Cuba to Mexico
Cuban diplomats
Cuban revolutionaries
People of the Cuban Revolution
Exiles of the Cuban Revolution in the United States
1950s in Cuba
20th-century Cuban politicians